These are the results of the Bocce at the 2021 Islamic Solidarity Games which took place between 9 and 12 August 2022 in Konya, Turkey.

Lyonnaise

Men's precision shooting
9 August

Men's progressive shooting
9 August

Women's precision shooting
9 August

Women's progressive shooting
10 August

Mixed relay
9 August

Raffa

Men's singles
10–11 August

Men's doubles
10–11 August

Women's singles
10–11 August

Women's doubles
10–11 August

Mixed doubles
10–11 August

References

External links 
Official website
Results

2021 Islamic Solidarity Games